Engineering an Empire is a program on The History Channel that explores the engineering and/or architectural feats that were characteristic of some of the greatest societies on this planet. It is hosted by Peter Weller, famous for his acting role as RoboCop but also a lecturer at Syracuse University, where he completed his Master's in Roman and Renaissance Art. The executive producer is Delores Gavin. The show started as a documentary about the engineering feats of Ancient Rome and later evolved into a series. It originally ran for one full season of weekly episodes.

A video game, History: Egypt – Engineering an Empire, was released in 2010.

Reception
Engineering an Empire has received critical acclaim. The premiere "Rome" won two Emmys after being nominated in four categories.

Episodes

References 

The History Channel- Engineering an Empire
The History Channel - Episode Summary

External links 
 Engineering an Empire at History Vault
 

History (American TV channel) original programming
History of engineering
Works about ancient Rome
2005 American television series debuts
2007 American television series endings